Farid Daoud (born August 25, 1989 in Tizi Ouzou) is an Algerian football player. He currently plays for USM Annaba in the Algerian Ligue Professionnelle 2.

Club career
Daoud began his career in the junior ranks of his hometown club of JS Kabylie. He left the club briefly to pursue his studies at the USTO before returning to continue his playing career. In 2007, he left JSK to join MC Alger.

On December 12, 2007, Daoud made his professional debut for MC Alger in a league game against WA Tlemcen. Daoud came on as a substitute in the 70th minute with the game ending 0–0.

International career
On September 14, 2009, Daoud was called up by coach Abdelhak Benchikha to the Algerian Under-23 National Team for a ten-day training camp in France. In December 2010, he was a member of the Under-23 team that won the 2010 UNAF U-23 Tournament in Morocco. On November 16, 2011, he was selected as part of Algeria's squad for the 2011 CAF U-23 Championship in Morocco.

Statistics

Statistics

References

External links
 DZFoot Profile

1989 births
Living people
Footballers from Tizi Ouzou
Kabyle people
Algerian footballers
Algeria under-23 international footballers
Algerian Ligue Professionnelle 1 players
JS Kabylie players
MC Alger players
Algeria youth international footballers
2011 CAF U-23 Championship players
Association football midfielders
21st-century Algerian people